Entourage Guimard is an art installation and Square-Victoria-OACI station entrance designed by Hector Guimard in Montreal's Victoria Square, in Quebec, Canada. 

The cast iron and Comblanchien stone Art Nouveau-style structure was donated by Régie autonome des transports parisiens (RATP), and is owned by Société de transport de Montréal. The structure was installed in Victoria Square in 1967, and restored in 2003.

See also

 An Entrance to the Paris Métropolitain
 Paris Métro entrances by Hector Guimard

References

External links
 
 Entourage Guimard - Montréal, Québec at Waymarking

20th-century architecture
1967 establishments in Canada
Art Nouveau architecture in Canada
Cast-iron architecture
Downtown Montreal
Montreal Metro
Public art in Montreal
Works by Hector Guimard